Zdziesławice may refer to the following places in Poland:
Zdziesławice, Lower Silesian Voivodeship (south-west Poland)
Zdziesławice, Lesser Poland Voivodeship (south Poland)